Juliantla is a town of Taxco de Alarcón Municipality, in the state of Guerrero, south-western Mexico, made famous by native star Joan Sebastian who made a 70's Spanish pop rock song after his hometown.

References

Populated places in Guerrero
Juliantla